Second cabinet of Azerbaijan Democratic Republic governed Azerbaijan Democratic Republic (ADR) between June 17, 1918 and December 7, 1918. It was formed after the first cabinet of Azerbaijan Democratic Republic dissolved and was led by Prime Minister of Azerbaijan Fatali Khan Khoyski with the following composition:

On October 6, 1918, when the government of Azerbaijan Democratic Republic moved to Baku, it conducted a few administrative reforms. The Ministry of Transportation, Postal Service and Telegraph was split into Ministry of Transportation and Ministry of Postal Service and Telegraph. and a new Ministry of Social Security and Religious Affairs was established.

Among notable contributions of the second cabinet are declaration of Azerbaijani language the state language of Azerbaijan Democratic Republic on June 27, 1918; declaration of red banner with white crescent and eight pointed star the first flag of the country on June 24, 1918 and changing it to a tri-color Azerbaijani flag which is the state flag of Azerbaijan Republic today.

See also
Cabinets of Azerbaijan Democratic Republic (1918-1920)
Current Cabinet of Azerbaijan Republic

References

Cabinets of Azerbaijan
Government ministers of Azerbaijan
Cabinets established in 1918
Cabinets disestablished in 1918
1918 establishments in Azerbaijan
1918 disestablishments in Azerbaijan